The International Cinema Hall(평양국제영화회관) is a cinema located in North Korea. It holds the Pyongyang International Film Festival.

See also 

 List of theatres in North Korea

References 

Theatres in North Korea
Buildings and structures in Pyongyang